Granville Christian Academy is a private Christian school at 1820 Newark Granville Rd, Granville, Ohio. The school uses Spring Hills Baptist Church as its campus. GCA educates students from kindergarten through 12th grade. It is a college prep private school. The school colors are purple and white, its mascot is the "bush".

Athletics 
GCA is a member of the Mid-Ohio Christian Athletic League (MOCAL), Central Ohio Athletic League (COAL), and the Ohio High School Athletic Association (OHS$A).
 
GCA supports the following sports
 Boys Soccer
 Boys Basketball
 Boys Baseball
 Girls Volleyball
 Girls Basketball
 Girls Softball
 Cross Country
 Dodge Ball

GCA has won several ACSI Ohio Valley State Championships. Most recently in Boys Varsity Soccer (2007 and 2008 State Championships). In addition, the Varsity Girls Volleyball team appeared in the State Championship games in 2006, 2007, and 2008. As well as Boys Varsity Basketball at the end of the 2008-2009 season, and Boys Varsity Soccer in 2006 and 2009; though none of these teams won the title.

Christian schools in Ohio
Private high schools in Ohio